José Antonio Pontón (born 22 February 1942) is a Spanish racing cyclist. He rode in the 1974 Tour de France.

References

External links
 

1942 births
Living people
Spanish male cyclists
Place of birth missing (living people)
Cyclists from Cantabria
People from Trasmiera